The Type 81, or Tribal class, frigates were ordered and built as sloops to carry out similar duties to the immediate post war improved s and s in the Persian Gulf. In the mid 1960s the seven Tribals were reclassified as second class general-purpose frigates to maintain frigate numbers. After the British withdrawal from East of Suez in 1971 the Tribals operated in the NATO North Atlantic sphere with the only update the fitting of Seacat missiles to all by 1977, limited by their single propeller and low speed of 24 knots. In 1979-80 age and crew and fuel shortages saw them transferred to the stand-by squadrons; three were reactivated in 1982 during the Falklands War for training and guardship duties in the West Indies.

History
The Tribals were designed during the 1950s as a response to the increasing cost of single-role vessels such as the Type 14s. They were first such 'multi role' vessels for the Royal Navy. They were designed specifically with colonial 'gunboat' duties in mind, particularly in the Middle East. They were therefore designed to be self-contained warships with weapon and sensor systems to cover many possible engagements, air conditioning to allow extended tropical deployment and such 'modern' habitability features as all bunk accommodation (as opposed to hammocks). The fitting of gas turbine boost engines was specifically intended to allow the frigates to almost instantly leave ports and naval bases in the event of nuclear war, rather than have to spend four to six hours to flash up the steam boilers. The G6 gas turbine proved reliable and was generally used to leave port during the frigates career and paved the way for gas turbine propulsion to become universal in the RN within 30 years.

Design
They were the first class of the Royal Navy to be designed from the start to operate a helicopter and the first small escorts to carry a long-range air search radar, the Type 965 with a single 'rake' AKE-1 antenna. They were armed with two QF 4.5-in (113 mm) Mark 5 guns salvaged from scrapped Second World War destroyers. Although these mountings were refurbished with Remote Power Control (RPC) operation, they still required manual loading on an exposed open back, mounting. Originally the intended gun armament was two twin  Second World War standard mounts, then  twin  70 caliber mounts which 256 ton weight for 2 turrets was too heavy.  A lighter automatic gun fit of two N(R) single automatic 4-inch guns, as fitted in Chile's Almirante-class destroyer  
still required a hull  longer and like twin 3/70s, were too expensive. A 3000-ton, light,  displacement exceeded the limit the UK Treasury would allow for a sloop or frigate design, in the 1960s So both automatic guns were rejected on account of weight, space and cost. Even though they provided a realistic solution to the RN AA/ DP gun requirement, due to cost, and the problem of cost of developing stocks and logistic support, for new types of ammunition and doubt of the usefulness of medium gun AA against post 1962 jet air and missile targets.

From the outset they were designed to carry the new GWS-21 Seacat anti-aircraft missile system anti-aircraft missile system but all except Zulu initially carried single Mark 7 40 mm Bofors guns in lieu. The rest of the class were fitted with Seacat in the 1970s using surplus missile systems, left over from s and  refits.

The Tribals were the first modern RN ships designed to use a combination of power sources, a feature which had been trialled with limited success in the 1930s in the minelayer . An additive mix of steam and gas turbine called "COmbined Steam and Gas" COSAG was used. This gave the rapid start-up and acceleration of a gas turbine engine coupled with the cruising efficiency and reliability of the steam turbine. They would cruise on the steam plant and use both systems driving the same shaft for a high-speed "boost". They suffered however from being single-shaft vessels which severely limited manoeuvrability, acceleration and deceleration. The single screw proved significantly limiting when they were used in the 1970s Cod Wars in terms of manoeuvering in ramming manoeuvres, for and against, Icelandic coast guard cutters. The cramped awkward nature of the helicopter pad and handling provision was also exposed in the 1976 Cod War and was a major reason that some s were given further refits in preference to the Tribals and maintained in higher status reserve in the early 1980s limitations on defence spending.

Shortcomings
The costs for the Tribal Class ships escalated above the costs first envisaged and the original order of ships, (over twenty), was cancelled after the first seven ships had been completed. Only four would have been built if it had been possible to cancel the contractual commitments the Royal Navy had entered into for the supply of complex engines and machinery for eight frigates. The class were still good warships in spite of being fitted with outdated guns, (they were described by some as 'guided flagpoles') if sometimes capable of 18 rounds per minute for the first two minutes, and proved the usefulness of the general purpose frigate concept and gas turbine propulsion, but the average unit costs of the Type 81s completed in 1963-64 was £500,000 more than the first eight Leanders and the final cost of over £5 million of the first Tribal, Ashanti, completed in 1961 was considered too high and hence limited the number actually built; the original intent was to build 23 Type 81s. This meant that further 1960s RN frigate development would be based on the more conservative steam-powered Type 12 (Whitby) class, subsequently modernised in the Type 12M (Rothesay) class and finalised in the excellent Type 12I (Leander)-class. The later Royal Navy Type 21 (Amazon) class "General Purpose Frigates" were originally envisaged for a similar gunboat role to the Tribal-class ships and to operate East of Suez.

Service
The class served throughout the 1960s and into the 1970s fulfilling their designed general purpose "colonial gunboat" role. When change in British foreign policy made this role redundant they found themselves being pressed into service in home waters in the Cod Wars of the 1970s. They were not particularly suited to these duties however, as they had a hull form optimised for the calm, shallow water of the Persian Gulf and with only a single shaft were unable to manoeuvre with the Icelandic patrol vessels at close quarters.

All were decommissioned from the Royal Navy during the mid-to-late 1970s with the manpower crisis also attributing to the rapid removal of the class from service. They were however given a brief reprieve by the Falklands War, with 3 mothballed Tribals (Gurkha, Tartar and Zulu) being reactivated to cover ships deployed to the South Atlantic or undergoing long-term repairs after the conflict. The remaining units were cannibalised for spare parts to enable the 3 ships to be refitted.  These ships were sold in 1984 to Indonesia.

Ships

The building costs given above are official figures from the Navy/Defence Estimates.  Note that Janes Fighting Ships quotes a slightly lower cost for Ashanti of £5,220,000, as against £5,315,000 quoted in the 1962-63 Navy Estimates.

Footnotes

References

 Blackman, Raymond V.B. Jane's Fighting Ships 1971–72. London: Sampson Low, Marston & Co, 1971. .
 Gardiner, Robert and Stephen Chumbley. Conway's All the World's Fighting Ships 1947–1995. Annapolis, Maryland: Naval Institute Press, 1995. .
 Jane's Fighting Ships 1977-78, Jane's Yearbooks, 

Frigate classes
Ship classes of the Royal Navy